Delvin, also known as Castletowndelvin or Castletown Delvin, is a civil parish in County Westmeath, Ireland.

Delvin is one of 7 civil parishes in the barony of Delvin in the Province of Leinster. The largest population centre is the town of Delvin.

Delvin civil parish comprises 46 townlands: Addinstown, Archerstown, Ballinlig, Ballinlough (Wadding), Ballinn, Ballinure aka Ballyhealy, Ballinvally, Ballyhealy aka Ballinure, Ballynaskeagh, Balrath North, Balrath South, Billstown, Bolandstown, Brownstown, Caddagh, Carnybrogan, Castletowndelvin aka Delvin, Cavestown and Rosmead, Clonleame, Clonmaskill, Clonmorrill, Clonnagapple, Clonyn, Cockstown, Crowinstown Great, Crowinstown Little, Delvin aka Castletowndelvin, Dunganstown, Earlsmeadow aka Lisclogher Little, Ellenstown, Grangestown, Kilgar, Killadoughran, Lisclogher Great, Lisclogher Little aka Earlsmeadow, Loughanstown, Mabestown, Martinstown, Mitchelstown, Mooretown, Moyleroe Big, Moyleroe Little, Mullaghcroy, Newtown, Printinstown, Robinstown Great, Robinstown Little, Rosmead and Cavestown, Southhill and Stonestown.

The neighbouring civil parishes are: Clonarney, Killallon (County Meath) and Killua to the north, Athboy and Kildalkey (County Meath) to the east, Killulagh to the south, and Kilcumny and St. Marys to the west.

References

External links
Delvin civil parish at the IreAtlas Townland Data Base
Delvin civil parish at townlands.ie
Delvin civil parish at The Placename Database of Ireland

Civil parishes of County Westmeath